The 2017 season is Rosenborg's 38th consecutive year in the top flight now known as Eliteserien, their 50th season in the top flight of Norwegian football and third season with Kåre Ingebrigtsen as permanent manager. They will participate in Eliteserien, the Cup, Mesterfinalen and the 2017–18 UEFA Champions League, entering at the Second qualifying round stage. They qualified for the group stage of the 2017–18 UEFA Europa League. This year will mark Rosenborg's 100th anniversary, an event that will be marked with the game against Lillestrøm on 20 May, one day after the 100th anniversary.

Squad

Transfers

Winter

In:

Out:

Summer

In:

Out:

Competitions

Eliteserien

Results summary

Results by round

Results

Table

Norwegian Cup

Mesterfinalen

Champions League

Qualifying phase

UEFA Europa League

Qualifying rounds

Group stage

Club Friendlies

Squad statistics

Appearances and goals

|-
|colspan="16"|Players away from Rosenborg on loan:

|-
|colspan="16"|Players who appeared for Rosenborg no longer at the club:

|}

Disciplinary record

See also
Rosenborg BK seasons

References 

2017
Rosenborg
Norwegian football championship-winning seasons